John Fekner (born 1950 in New York City) is an American artist known for his spray painted environmental and conceptual outdoor works.

Fekner's has created paintings, cast paper reliefs, video, music recordings and performance works, sculpture, photography and computer-generated work. Fekner has addressed issues involving concepts of perception and transformation, as well as specific environmental and sociological concerns such as urban decay, greed, chemical pollutants, mass media and Native American Indians.

Early life
Fekner began writing poetry as a young teenager, and his first outdoor graffiti in 1968 were the words Itchycoo Park painted at Gorman Park 85th Street Park in Jackson Heights, Queens. Along with his accomplices on the park house roof, he painted the phrase in large white letters across the front of the building. Fekner appropriated the name of the popular hit written and recorded by the Small Faces about a park in Newham, England. Subsequently, the Jackson Heights local football team took the name, Itchycoo Chiefs in the 1970s. Ten years later, Fekner used the park as a base for his stencils projects. In May 1978, he curated the Detective Show with help from the Institute for Art and Urban Resources (P.S. 1). A group of thirty artists including Gordon Matta-Clark, Don Leicht, Len Bellinger, Lucio Pozzi, Lou Forgione, Richard Artschwager, Frances Hynes, Karen Shaw and Claudia De Monte hid art and created subtle art work in situ throughout the park.

Stencil works
In 1976, Fekner began to spray paint temporary  messages onto buildings in New York City using hand-cut cardboard stencils and spray paint. First seen on the industrial streets and highways of Queens, the East River bridges, and later in the South Bronx, his signs (such as Industrial Fossil, Urban Decay and Decay/Abandoned) were spray painted in areas that were in need of construction, demolition or reconstruction. The projects succeeded when the existing condition was removed or remedied.

In February 1980, Fekner began working in, around, and out of Fashion Moda, a storefront for experimental art and cultural exchange, and an outpost for showcasing graffiti, breakdancing and rapping.  I

In 1982, Fekner curated From The Monkey To The Monitor which featured his NOTV4U2C wall mural and audio loop installation, Don Leicht's metal Space Invaders, Fred Baca's drawings and a live performance by Phoebe Legere.

In 1968, he painted the words Itchycoo Park in large white letters on an empty building in Gorman Park, New York.

In 1978, he curated the Detective Show at the same outdoor location in Queens  which included the words street museum on the invitational card. In reaction to the desolation of the abandoned burnt-out buildings of the South Bronx, Fekner stenciled Last Hope in large letters above one crumbling structure.

In 1981, Martin Nisenholtz invited Fekner, Andy Warhol, Keith Haring and John Matos/Crash to experiment on the early interactive teletext system Telidon at NYU's Alternate Media Center, the predecessor of its Interactive Telecommunications Program. Fekner received his first international award at Toronto's Video Culture Festival in the Videotex category for Toxic Wastes From A to Z, an 8-bit computer graphics  animation created at AMC which featured a rap by k-8 students from a South Bronx school.

Collaborations
Fekner began collaborating with Bronx artist Don Leicht at PS1 now called MoMA PS1 where they shared a studio in 1976. In 1982, they began a series of work and installations using steel, cut metal, aluminum and automotive paints based on Nishikado's Space Invaders arcade game with the statement: "Your Space Has Been Invaded-Our Children are Fighting a Terrible War. Whole families are being sent to Battlescreen." Their "Beauty's Only Street Deep" was installed at the Wooster Collective's 11 Spring Street street art 2006 exhibition in NYC.

Music projects / Idioblast
In 1983, Fekner formed his own band City Squad composed of musicians and non-musicians as an extension of Queensites, a group of teenagers from Jackson Heights who assisted with the outdoor stencil work. In September, Fekner released his first rap/rock 12" EP on his own Vinyl Gridlock record label. The A-side, "2 4 5 7 9 11" had Kwame Monroe, aka Bear 167, a South Bronx graffiti artist as the guest rapper; and the B-side featured Dave Santaniello on rock vocals on "Rock Steady".  On the Apple II, Fekner experimented with early speech synthesis programs, Votrax and SAM-Software Automatic Mouth as vocal tracks on "2 4 5 7 9 11" and on his Idioblast (album) in 1984.  In addition to playing keyboards, electronic drums and vocals, he wrote the music and lyrics for the eight songs on the album which featured extensive sampling and tape loops of TV, radio, Native American voices, phone and airport transmissions over rock/rap/hip hop beats. Tracks on the album included Travelogue The 80s, I Get Paid To Clap, The Beat, The Sight Of The Child, Wheels Over Indian Trails and Rapicasso, which Fekner also created as a 6' × 12' six-panel painting. Both the painting and song pay homage to Picasso's The Three Dancers. Fekner spray painted LCD-style letters on industrial silkscreens to portray three breakdancers, the song's lyrics acknowledging the work, energy and spirit in breakdancing, rapping and graffiti: "Watch the street, see the modern art, it's the present and future tied to his heart." On Earth Day 1990, Fekner painted over it.

Concrete People music and video
The 12" EP single, "Concrete People/Concrete Concerto", was a music collaboration with Dennis Mann (1950–2008) and Al Belfiore who programmed the Linn LM-1 Drum Computer. Fekner recorded at Mann's Monkey Hill Studios from 1983 to 1989 where the Fatback Band, whose "King Tim III (Personality Jock)", considered to be the first commercially released rap single in 1979, were also recording. On both "Concrete People/Concrete Concerto", Fekner worked with musicians Sasha Sumner (sax), Jim Recchione (harmonica), Sandra Seymour (vocals), Sandy Mann (vocals) and Andrew Ruhren (animator and EP cover illustration). Concrete People was a popular dance club video, shown on USA Network Night Flight (TV series)'s Salute to Animation with Peter Gabriel's "Sledgehammer", Talking Heads "And She Was" and Timbuk 3's "The Future's So Bright I Gotta Wear Shades".  "Concrete People" and "The Last Days of Good and Evil"("Concrete Concerto" soundtrack) both won honorary awards in the Prix Ars Electronica's Computer Animation category, together with award winner John Lasseter for his Luxo Jr. and Red's Dream in 1987 and 1988 respectively.

Reviews
New York Times art critic John Russell wrote…Fekner is an artist who works not only in New York but with New York. The city in its more disinherited aspects is the raw material with which he has been working ever since he got a studio space in P.S. 1 in Long Island City in 1976 and learned to regard the huge dilapidated building as "an elderly person who has acutely perceived his experience of life." He went on to work outdoors in Queens and in the Bronx in ways that gave point and urgency to places long sunk in despair. With a word or two (Decay, for instance, or Broken Promises), he brought an element of street theater into disaster areas. With a single stenciled phrase (Wheels Over Indian Trails, for instance) he mingled present with past on the side of the Pulaski Bridge near the Queens-Midtown Tunnel. What in other hands might have been vandalism had a salutary effect. People in desolate parts of the city saw more, felt more, thought more and came out of their apathy.

Lucy Lippard in the Village Voice called him "caption writer to the urban environment, ad-man for the opposition."

The Wooster Collective said, "For us, John Fekner's pioneering stencil work is as important to the history of the urban art movement as the work of artists like Haring, Basquiat. It was artists like Fekner, Leicht, Hambleton and others who truly held down the scene back in the early 1980s."

Discography

Idioblast

Idioblast is an album by an American artist John Fekner, recorded and released in 1984 under the name John Fekner City Squad. In addition to playing keyboards, electronic drums and vocals, Fekner wrote and composed the music and lyrics for the eight songs on the album. Idioblast, released on Fekner's own independent record label Vinyl Gridlock Records, is an experimental and eclectic mix of songs featuring extensive sampling and tape loops of TV, radio, Native American voices, phone and airport controller transmissions over rock, rap and hip-hop beats.

Background
In 1983, the Walker Arts Center and Minneapolis College of Art and Design presented a joint exhibition entitled When Words Become Works. Invited by Diane Shamash, director of MCAD gallery, Fekner agreed to create two new songs specifically for the show to be released as a 12" 33 1/3 rpm EP limited-edition vinyl record under the name of "John Fekner City Squad." The A-side, 2 4 5 7 9 11 featured Kwame Monroe, a.k.a. Bear 167, a South Bronx graffiti artist as the guest rapper. 2 4 5 7 9 11 opens by beautifully incorporating the "I'm-as-mad-as-hell-and-I'm-not-gonna-take-it-anymore" dialogue from the movie Network. Vocals are shared by Fekner, Sandra Seymour and the late Bear 167. It is a high energy rap songs about turning off the television and finding out that "what life is all about is right here on the block."

Recording
Fekner recording tracks in 1983 and 1984 with his fellow musicians Dennis Mann, Sandra Seymour, Jim Recchione, Paul Sottnick, Robert Morales, Richard Maffei and Steve Grivas, releasing Idioblast in May 1984. Fekner, who was not trained as a musician, would  use whatever tools were necessary when composing his music on electronic keyboards and drum machines. He experimented and extensively utilized Votrax and Software Automatic Mouth(SAM), two new text Speech synthesis programs for personal computers. Besides the main vocals and instruments, all the other aural information on the album was recorded on an inexpensive Walkman. “Sophisticated equipment isn't that much of a necessity,” says Fekner.

Theme
Most of the lyrics on Idioblast focus on concepts that Fekner addresses in his outdoor spray-painted messages seen in New York and other cities in Canada, England, Sweden and Germany. Like the stenciled messages, most of lyrics are slanted ideologically to the left and serve as warnings about corporate media, television, toxic wastes and other social issues. "Virtually every tune on the album is based on the Street Art experience. In a tune called Rapicasso Fekner raps, "Musicians were painting, painters were playing/ Styles were blending like the current trends...Watch the street see the modern art/ It's present and future tied to his heart." Fekner parades a series of found sounds, approximate rap, beat poetry and quick-cut imagery against a steady, pre-fab pulse. But unlike the worst cases of art-rock hybrids where the pretentious intent overwhelms the medium, Idioblast sounds good, beat box or not.

Track listing

Reviews
Upon its release, Idioblast was popular among Club DJ's, college radio stations and independent music pools, receiving good reviews via CMJ and Rockpool music magazines. In her review In Stroll Magazine, Susan Orlean wrote, "Idioblast offers plenty to chew on, both mentally and rhythmically. The rough sound and production do not detract from music that is basically tuneful and engaging, and images that are vivid.”

Selected bibliography
Stencil Projects 1978–1979, Lund & New York (Edition Sellem, 1979) 
Queensites (Wedgepress & Cheese, 1982) 
Beauty's Only Screen Deep (Wedge Press, Inc.#10, 1983)
Cassette Gazette (B-Sellers, 1985)

Notes

Further reading
 
 
 
 
 Gumpert, Lynn, Curator, New Work New York at the New Museum, Exhibition catalog essay, January 30 – March 25, 1982. p. 12–15
 
 
 
 
 
 Lippard, Lucy, Get The Message-A Decade Of Social Change, Penguin Group (USA) Incorporated, 1985 
 
Robert C. Morgan, Domus Magazine, Italy 1985

External links

 Official website
 Robert C. Morgan review of Idioblast on John Fekner's site
 John Russell - ART: 'New Work New York' At The New Museum

1950 births
Living people
20th-century American composers
20th-century American male musicians
20th-century American painters
21st-century American painters
American contemporary painters
American male painters
American photographers
Articles containing video clips
Culture jamming techniques
Experimental composers
Male classical composers
Musicians from Queens, New York